Valenzuela station, formerly known as Polo station, is a former railway station located on the North Main Line in Dalandanan, Valenzuela, Metro Manila, Philippines. It is currently being rebuilt as part of the first phase of the North–South Commuter Railway.

History 
The station opened in as Polo station, in what was then the municipality of Polo in Bulacan. This was originally part of the railway line connecting Manila to northern Luzon. It once served as a flag stop. Along with the then-municipality, it was later renamed and known as Valenzuela station.

The station was abandoned in 1997 after services to Meycauayan ceased. It was supposed to be built as a result of the Northrail project, a rebuilding of the line from Manila to Pampanga which would partly use the old right-of-way. The project commenced in 2007, however, construction was halted though as of 2011. The ill-governed project did not continue even after a renegotiation, due to China calling off the overseas development assistance fund for the project.

With the full swing construction of the North-South Commuter Railway, the old abandoned station is cordoned off and will be restored as part of the construction agreement. The new elevated station will be located immediately above the old one.

Revival 
This station will be one of the first 6 stations of the Manila-Clark Railway or North-South Commuter Railway, a mass transit railway from Manila to the New Clark City. It is expected to be finished by 2021.

It is also a likely target for restoration for the Metro North Commuter Line as the station before it, Acacia station, is reopened. Two stations may be considered. One candidate site, apart from the old station in Polo, Valenzuela, near the PNR bridge tunnel in the Karuhatan-Malinta border, the Malinta Bridge, if realized, will be within the historical railway station in Dalandanan, where Antonio Luna once planned defenses against the Americans during the precursors of the Philippine-American war. It is highly implied that the restoration of services may reach Meycauayan and beyond as it did in the past.

Railway restoration was hampered by the NLEX Harbor Link Segment 10.1 construction, which runs at vital parts of the route going to Valenzuela, which has since been opened on March 1, 2019. A vital component to the restoration of the services is the reconstruction of the railway bridge crossing Tullahan River, which has since been demolished and destroyed due to obsolescence and the construction of the expressway above. Studies to rebuild the bridge and eventually reintroduce railway services in Polo has been started.

References

Philippine National Railways stations
Railway stations in Metro Manila
Buildings and structures in Valenzuela, Metro Manila
Proposed railway stations in the Philippines